The Pennsylvania Trolley Museum is a museum in Washington, Pennsylvania, dedicated to operation and preservation of streetcars and trolleys. The museum primarily contains historic trolleys from Pennsylvania, but their collection includes examples from nearby Toledo, Ohio; New Orleans, and even an open sided car from Brazil. Many have been painstakingly restored to operating condition. Other unique cars either waiting for restoration or incompatible with the Pennsylvania trolley gauge track are on display in a massive trolley display building. Notable examples on static display include a J.G. Brill “brilliner” car which was introduced as a competitor to the PCC, locomotives, and a horse car from the early days of Pittsburgh’s public transit systems.

History
The origin of the museum can be traced to a group of electric railway enthusiasts who acquired Pittsburgh Railways Company M-1, a small four wheel Pittsburgh trolley in 1949. It and Pittsburgh Railways Company 3756, a single end low floor and West Penn Railways Company 832 were stored for them in Ingram Car House by Pittsburgh Railways until 1954. In 1953 the Pittsburgh Railways Interurban line from Pittsburgh to Washington was abandoned and the newly formed Pittsburgh Electric Railway Club bought  of the line next to the old County Home trolley stop north of Washington in Chartiers Township, Pennsylvania. On February 7, 1954 the three trolleys stored in Pittsburgh were run to the museum site from Pittsburgh under their own power.  On the founding day operation of the cars was enjoyed by supporters making this the first trolley museum operation in Pennsylvania.  In subsequent months the interurban line was dismantled back to the Drake stop in Upper St. Clair. Pittsburgh Railways Company #4393 returned riders to Pittsburgh becoming the last passenger service on the line.

Following a period of restoration and construction of a power station and carbarn the Arden Trolley Museum opened to the public in June 1963.

The museum appeared in a 1984 episode of Mister Rogers' Neighborhood, where host Fred Rogers takes a ride on and operates Philadelphia streetcar #5326.

Preservation

According to their web site, the museum's mission is "to communicate the story of Pennsylvania's Trolley Era to a diverse audience through the preservation, interpretation, and use of its collection of electric railway and railroad equipment."

To that end, the museum includes a collection of 45 street and electric railway vehicles in various condition. Featured in the museum collection is New Orleans streetcar #832, built by the Perley Thomas Company (High Point, North Carolina) in 1923.  This car was formerly used on various lines in New Orleans, including the Desire line which was made famous in the play by Tennessee Williams, A Streetcar Named Desire.  Car #832 was illustrated by a photo in an article in the December 15, 1947, issue of Life magazine, published when the play opened on Broadway.

Much of the museum's collection is housed in the Museum's "Trolley Display Building" which opened May 6, 2005.  Visitors can take a four- mile ride on a restored functioning trolley.

A special ride during the Christmas season includes a visit from Santa Claus. Since the advent of the Santa event the museum has added events for Easter (Bunny Trolley) and the fall season event titled Pumpkin Patch Trolley.

The original museum operating line consisted of a one-half-mile section of the abandoned Pittsburgh Railways Co. Washington interurban line which until 1953 connected to Pittsburgh via the route that still serves sections of Bethel Park. The museum line was extended north along the track bed of the abandoned Pennsylvania Railroad branch to the Arden Mines. Between 1979 and 1995, museum volunteers constructed new (5'2-1/2 gauge) track along this right of way to a location near the former coal mining town.  This added  to the track and allowed stations to be opened at the County Fairground and Arden Mines, where a loop track was constructed, simplifying the operation of cars.  In 2004, the original museum track was extended along the original interurban route to a point near North Main Street and Country Club Road.  At this site another loop (McClane School Loop) was constructed, making possible the continuous operation of single-ended trolleys.  Tracks connecting to the Trolley Display Building, attached to this section of the line, were opened in 2008.

The Richfol shelter at car house #1 came from the Richfol Stop which was located at the north end of Canonsburg on the Pittsburgh Railways Interurban line from Pittsburgh to Washington.

In September 2004, the area surrounding the museum flooded in the wake of Hurricane Ivan. The floodwaters caused substantial damage to the museum which has since been repaired.

Events
The Pennsylvania Trolley Museum participates in the annual Washington County Fair by providing trolley rides from nearby parking lots to the fairgrounds.

The museum hosted the 2007 conference for the Association of Railway Museums. The conference was held on October 3–7, 2007, and was supported by a grant from the Pennsylvania Historical and Museum Commission.

References

External links

Pennsylvania Trolley Museum
Heritage Rail Alliance
Port Authority of Allegheny County

Railroad museums in Pennsylvania
Heritage railroads in Pennsylvania
Museums in Washington County, Pennsylvania
Washington, Pennsylvania
Street railway museums in the United States